The 2013–14 Toros Mexico season was the fifth season of the Toros Mexico professional indoor soccer club and second under the "Toros Mexico" name. The Toros, a Pacific Division team in the Professional Arena Soccer League, played their home games in the UniSantos Park in Tijuana, Mexico. The team was led by owner and head coach Joe Pollard with assistant coach Cristian Acosta.

Season summary
Unlike the 17 US-based PASL teams, Toros Mexico and the other two Mexico-based teams did not participate in the 2013–14 United States Open Cup for Arena Soccer.

History
The Toros played the 2009-10, 2010–11, and 2011–12 seasons at Furati Arena as "Revolución Tijuana". In September 2012, Ramon Quezada and Eduardo Vele sold the team to head coach Joe Pollard but retained the rights to the old name and logo.

The team had mixed results in the 2012–13 regular season, compiling a 7–9 record, but placed second in the PASL's Southwest Division. The team advanced to the postseason but lost two straight games to the Las Vegas Legends in the Divisional Finals, ending their playoff run.

Schedule

Pre-season

Regular season

♥ Rescheduled from February 16.

Post-season

References

External links
Toros Mexico official website

Toros Mexico
Toros Mexico
Toros Mexico 2013
Toros Mexico 2013
Toros Mexico 2013